King Kao of Zhou, alternatively King Kaozhe of Zhou (周考哲王), personal name Jī Wéi, was the thirty first king of the Chinese Zhou dynasty and the nineteenth of the Eastern Zhou.  He reigned from 440 BC to 426 BC.

King Kao's father was King Zhending, son of the King Yuan of Zhou. Kao fathered King Weilie of Zhou, whose reign started in 425 BC, after Kao's death.

His grandson was King An of Zhou.

Family
Sons:
 Prince Wu (d. 402 BC), ruled as King Weilie of Zhou from 425–402 BC

Ancestry

See also
Family tree of ancient Chinese emperors

References 

426 BC deaths
Zhou dynasty kings
5th-century BC Chinese monarchs
Year of birth unknown